The Juncker Commission was the European Commission in office from 1 November 2014 to 30 November 2019. Its president was Jean-Claude Juncker, who presided over 27 other commissioners (one from each of the states composing the European Union, except Luxembourg, which is Juncker's state). In July 2014, Juncker was officially elected to succeed José Manuel Barroso, who completed his second five-year term in that year.

Election

In the 2014 parliamentary election, Juncker campaigned as the candidate  of the European People's Party (EPP) for the presidency of the European Commission. The EPP won a plurality in parliament, and on 27 June, the European Council nominated him for the post. Later on 15 July 2014, the European Parliament elected Juncker as the new Commission president. On 22 October, the European Parliament approved the Juncker Commission in its entirety and during the 23–24 October 2014 meeting of the European Council the Council formally appointed the new Commission. On 1 November 2014, the new Commission officially assumed office. Juncker has outlined a ten-point agenda for his Presidency focusing on jobs and growth.

Policy 
Under the Juncker Commission, the EU General Data Protection Regulation was passed. The Commission co-developed the law, culminating in a trilogue proposal between the Commission, Parliament, and Council on 15 December 2015. The GDPR entered into force on 24 May 2016.

Institutional reorganisation 
Juncker made the Commission's work more top-down by strengthening the Secretariat-General in two ways. Firstly, he gave it a gatekeeper function regarding new initiatives. All "major initiatives" must henceforth be approved by the "relevant Vice-President(s) and the First Vice-President, unless they are initiated directly by the President". Secondly, the SG was made chair of all inter-service steering groups (ISGs) dealing with priority initiatives in the Commission's work programme.:9-10 :8-9

Juncker also abolished the position of Commissioner for Climate Action, merging it with the energy portfolio, to improve cooperation between staff in the Directorate-General (DG) Energy and the former DG Climate Action.:10

Commissioners
The following college of commissioners serves under Juncker's presidency:

 Parties
 (14)
 (7)
 (4)
 (1)

Former members

President's cabinet
The President's cabinet supports the President of the commission, and thus has a very central role in coordinating the work of the European Commission as a whole. The president's cabinet is led by Clara Martinez Alberola. Formerly, it was led by Martin Selmayr, who has been described as "the most powerful EU chief of staff ever."

Project teams
Juncker has for the first time proposed a commission that clusters certain members together under designated policy areas. These clusters are known as "Project Teams" and will each be headed by one of the vice presidents. Each team is composed of a core membership in addition to members who may fall under its respective umbrella as needed. Timmermans and Georgieva both oversee all commissioners while the remaining five project teams are as follows:

A Connected Digital Single Market
Vice President: Andrus Ansip (Digital Single Market)
Elżbieta Bieńkowska (Internal Market, Industry, Entrepreneurship and SMEs)
Corina Crețu (Regional Policy)
Phil Hogan (Agriculture and Rural Development)
Věra Jourová (Justice, Consumers and Gender Equality)
Pierre Moscovici (Economic and Financial Affairs, Taxation and Customs)
Günther Oettinger (Digital Economy and Society)
Marianne Thyssen (Employment, Social Affairs, Skills and Labour Mobility)
Vytenis Andriukaitis (Health and Food Safety)
Jonathan Hill/Valdis Dombrovskis (Financial Stability, Financial Services and Capital Markets Union)
Carlos Moedas (Research, Science and Innovation)
Tibor Navracsics (Education, Culture, Youth and Sport)
Margrethe Vestager (Competition)

A Deeper and Fairer Economic and Monetary Union
Vice President: Valdis Dombrovskis (Euro and Social Dialogue)
Elżbieta Bieńkowska (Internal Market, Industry, Entrepreneurship and SMEs)
Corina Crețu (Regional Policy)
Věra Jourová (Justice, Consumers and Gender Equality)
Jonathan Hill/Valdis Dombrovskis (Financial Stability, Financial Services and Capital Markets Union)
Pierre Moscovici (Economic and Financial Affairs, Taxation and Customs)
Tibor Navracsics (Education, Culture, Youth and Sport)
Marianne Thyssen (Employment, Social Affairs, Skills and Labour Mobility)

A New Boost for Jobs, Growth and Investment
Vice President: Jyrki Katainen (Jobs, Growth, Investment and Competitiveness)
Elżbieta Bieńkowska (Internal Market, Industry, Entrepreneurship and SMEs)
Miguel Arias Cañete (Climate Action and Energy)
Corina Crețu (Regional Policy)
Jonathan Hill/Valdis Dombrovskis (Financial Stability, Financial Services and Capital Markets Union)
Pierre Moscovici (Economic and Financial Affairs, Taxation and Customs)
Günther Oettinger (Digital Economy and Society)
Violeta Bulc (Transport)
Marianne Thyssen (Employment, Social Affairs, Skills and Labour Mobility)
Vytenis Andriukaitis (Health and Food Safety)
Dimitris Avramopoulos (Migration, Home Affairs and Citizenship)
Johannes Hahn (European Neighbourhood Policy and Enlargement Negotiations)
Phil Hogan (Agriculture and Rural Development)
Věra Jourová (Justice, Consumers and Gender Equality)
Cecilia Malmström (Trade)
Carlos Moedas (Research, Science and Innovation)
Tibor Navracsics (Education, Culture, Youth and Sport)
Karmenu Vella (Environment, Maritime Affairs and Fisheries)
Margrethe Vestager (Competition)

A Resilient Energy Union with a Forward-Looking Climate Change Policy
Vice President: Maroš Šefčovič (Energy Union)
Elżbieta Bieńkowska (Internal Market, Industry, Entrepreneurship and SMEs)
Miguel Arias Cañete (Climate Action and Energy)
Corina Crețu (Regional Policy)
Phil Hogan (Agriculture and Rural Development)
Karmenu Vella (Environment, Maritime Affairs and Fisheries)
Carlos Moedas (Research, Science and Innovation)
Violeta Bulc (Transport)
Věra Jourová (Justice, Consumers and Gender Equality)
Cecilia Malmström (Trade)
Günther Oettinger (Digital Economy and Society)
Pierre Moscovici (Economic and Financial Affairs, Taxation and Customs)
Marianne Thyssen (Employment, Social Affairs, Skills and Labour Mobility)
Margrethe Vestager (Competition)

A Stronger Global Actor
Vice President: Federica Mogherini (Foreign Affairs and Security Policy)
Johannes Hahn (European Neighbourhood Policy and Enlargement Negotiations)
Cecilia Malmström (Trade)
Neven Mimica (International Cooperation and Development)
Christos Stylianides (Humanitarian Aid and Crisis Management)
Dimitris Avramopoulos (Migration, Home Affairs and Citizenship)
Miguel Arias Cañete (Climate Action and Energy)
Violeta Bulc (Transport)

A European Agenda on Migration
In 2015, when European migrant crisis unfolded, new project team was formed.

First Vice President: Frans Timmermans (Better Regulation, Interinstitutional Relations, the Rule of Law and the Charter of Fundamental Rights)
Federica Mogherini (Foreign Affairs and Security Policy)
Dimitris Avramopoulos (Migration, Home Affairs and Citizenship)
Johannes Hahn (European Neighbourhood Policy and Enlargement Negotiations)
Neven Mimica (International Cooperation and Development)
Christos Stylianides (Humanitarian Aid and Crisis Management)
Věra Jourová (Justice, Consumers and Gender Equality)
Julian King (Security Union)

References

External links 
Political guidelines
Priorities

 
European Commissions
2014 establishments in Europe